Rhone American Cemetery and Memorial is a Second World War American military war grave cemetery, located  within the city of Draguignan,  north of Saint-Tropez, in Southern France. It is administered by the American Battle Monuments Commission.

History
Those interred died mostly in the summer of 1944 during Operation Dragoon, the Allied invasion of southern France from the Mediterranean, which followed the Allied invasion of Normandy. This operation was designed to open a second beachhead and Allied combat zone in France, threatening the Axis units confronting the Normandy combat zone, and thus to accelerate the Allied drive into Western Europe. Those interred were mainly part of the U.S. Seventh Army, in particular the US 45th Infantry Division, the US 36th Infantry Division, and the US 3rd Infantry Division.

Layout
The cemetery, created 19 August 1944, has headstones arranged in straight lines, divided into four plots, and grouped around an oval pool. Small gardens are placed at each end of the cemetery which is overlooked by a chapel. Within the chapel are decorative mosaics, murals (by Austin M. Purves Jr.) and sculptured figures. Between the chapel and the graves, a bronze relief map details US military operations in the region. On a wall of the terrace, 294 names of those missing in action are inscribed (rosettes mark those since recovered and identified).

References

External links

 American Battle Monuments Commission home page
 AMBC: Rhone American Cemetery and Memorial
 ABMC Rhone cemetery video .wmv
 ABMC Rhone cemetery booklet .pdf
 

World War II memorials in France
World War II cemeteries in France
American Battle Monuments Commission
Buildings and structures in Var (department)
1944 establishments in France
Tourist attractions in Var (department)